Dalrymple is a surname, originating with the toponym of Dalrymple, East Ayrshire, Scotland.
Used as a surname denoting origin since the 16th century, it was carried by the viscounts of Stair, East Ayrshire in the 17th century (earls of Stair since 1703).
It also occurs as a commoners' surname since at least the 18th century. 
It has rarely been used as a given name since the later 18th century.

Dalrymple Baronets

Baronets, of Stair (1664)
 James Dalrymple, 1st Viscount of Stair (1619–1695), created Viscount of Stair in 1690
 John Dalrymple, 1st Earl of Stair (1648–1707), initially 2nd Viscount of Stair, made 1st Earl of Stair in 1703

Earls of Stair (1703)
 John Dalrymple, 1st Earl of Stair (1648–1707), initially 2nd Viscount of Stair, made Earl of Stair in 1703
 John Dalrymple, 2nd Earl of Stair (1679–1747)
 James Dalrymple, 3rd Earl of Stair (d. 1760)
 William Dalrymple-Crichton, 4th Earl of Stair (1699–1769)
 John Dalrymple, 5th Earl of Stair (1720–1789)
 John Dalrymple, 6th Earl of Stair (1749–1821)
 John Dalrymple, 7th Earl of Stair (1784–1840)
 John Dalrymple, 8th Earl of Stair (1771–1853)
 North Dalrymple, 9th Earl of Stair (1776–1864)
 John Dalrymple, 10th Earl of Stair (1819–1903)
 John Dalrymple, 11th Earl of Stair (1848–1914)
 John Dalrymple, 12th Earl of Stair (1879–1961)
 John Dalrymple, 13th Earl of Stair (1906–1996)
 John Dalrymple, 14th Earl of Stair (b. 1961)

Baronets, of Bargeny (1697)
 Hew Dalrymple, Lord North Berwick, 1st Baronet (1653–1737)
 Sir Hew Dalrymple, 2nd Baronet (1712–1790)
 Sir Hew Dalrymple, 3rd Baronet (1746–1800)
 Sir Hew Dalrymple-Hamilton, 4th Baronet (1774–1834)
 Sir John Hamilton-Dalrymple, 5th Baronet (1780–1835)
 Sir Hew Hamilton-Dalrymple, 6th Baronet (1814–1887)
 Sir John Dalrymple, 7th Baronet (1824–1888)
 Sir Walter Hamilton-Dalrymple, 8th Baronet (1854–1920)
 Sir Hew Hamilton-Dalrymple, 9th Baronet (1888–1959)
 Sir Hew Hamilton-Dalrymple, 10th Baronet (b. 1926)

Baronets, of Cranstoun (1698)
 Sir James Dalrymple, 1st Baronet (1650–1719)
 Sir John Dalrymple, 2nd Baronet (1682–1743)
 Sir William Dalrymple, 3rd Baronet (1704–1771)
 Sir John Dalrymple Hamilton, 4th Baronet (1726–1810)
 John Dalrymple, 8th Earl of Stair (1771–1853), succeeded as 8th Earl of Stair in 1840

Baronets, of Hailes, Midlothian (1701)
 Sir David Dalrymple, 1st Baronet (1665–1721)
 Sir James Dalrymple, 2nd Baronet (1692–1751)
 David Dalrymple, Lord Hailes 3rd Baronet (1726–1792)
 Sir James Dalrymple, 4th Baronet (d. 1800)
 Sir John Pringle Dalrymple, 5th Baronet (d. 1829)

Baronets, of High Mark (1815)
 Sir Hew Whiteford Dalrymple, 1st Baronet (1750–1830)
 Sir Adolphus Dalrymple, 2nd Baronet (1784–1866)

Baronets, of New Hailes (1887)
 Sir Charles Dalrymple, 1st Baronet (1839–1916)
 Sir David Dalrymple, 2nd Baronet (1879–1932)
 Sir Charles Dalrymple, 3rd Baronet (1915–1971)

Surname
 Abner Dalrymple (1857–1939), American baseball player
 Alexander Dalrymple (1737–1808), Scottish geographer and the first Hydrographer of the British Admiralty
 Brian E. Dalrymple, Canadian fingerprint scientist 
 Bruce Dalrymple (born 1964), American basketball player
 Campbell Dalrymple (1725–1767), British military officer and Governor of Guadeloupe
 Clay Dalrymple (born 1936), American baseball player
 Farel Dalrymple, American artist and alternative comics creator
 Frederick Dalrymple (1907–1988), birth name of Frederick Dalberg, English born South African opera singer
 Frederick Dalrymple-Hamilton (1890–1974), British naval officer
 George Elphinstone Dalrymple (born 1826), Australian explorer, public servant and politician
 G. Brent Dalrymple, American geologist
 Ian Dalrymple (1903–1989),  British screenwriter, film director and producer
 Jack Dalrymple
 Jack Dalrymple (musician), member of musical band $wingin' Utter$
 Jack Dalrymple, 32nd Governor of North Dakota and businessman
 Jamie Dalrymple (born 1981), English cricketer
 Jerry Dalrymple, (born 1907), All-American Football Player, Tulane University
 John Dalrymple 
 John Dalrymple (died 1742) (1699–1742), Member of Parliament for Wigtown Burghs, 1728–1734
 John Dalrymple (physician) (1803–1852), English ophthalmologist
 John Dalrymple (political writer) (1734–1779)
 Sir John Charles Dalrymple-Hay (1821–1912), 3rd Baronet, was a Scottish Admiral and politician
 John Hamilton Elphinstone Dalrymple (1819–1888), British Army general
 Learmonth White Dalrymple (c.1827–1906), New Zealand educationalist
 Leona Dalrymple (born 1884), American author
 Robert Dalrymple (1880–1970), Scottish footballer
 Timothy Dalrymple, associate director of content at Patheos.com, a religious website
 Louis Dalrymple (1866–1905), American caricaturist
 William Dalrymple
 William Dalrymple (historian) (born 1965), Scottish historian and writer
 William Dalrymple (1678–1744), Scottish MP in the British Parliament
 William Dalrymple (British Army officer) (1736–1807), Scottish soldier and MP in the British Parliament

Pseudonym
 Theodore Dalrymple, pen name of Anthony Daniels

Fictional characters
 Charlie Dalrymple, a fictional character in Brigadoon, a musical written by Alan Jay Lerner and Frederick Loewe
 Lady Dalrymple, a viscountess in Persuasion, a novel by Jane Austen
 Russell Dalrymple, portrayed by Bob Balaban, the fictional head of NBC in the sitcom Seinfeld
 The Honourable Daisy Dalrymple, an amateur detective in the book series by author Carola Dunn
 Burgundy Dalrymple, a fictional character in Skulduggery Pleasant, a book series by Derek Landy

Given name 
 Dalrymple Maitland (1848–1919), Isle of Man politician
 William Dalrymple Maclagan (1826–1910), Archbishop of York from 1891 to 1908
 Hew Dalrymple Ross (1779–1868), British soldier
 James Norman Dalrymple Anderson, University of London law academic

See also
 Lady Dalrymple (disambiguation)
 Viscount of Dalrymple
 Dalrymple (disambiguation)